George Samouelle (–1846) was a curator in the British Museum (Natural History) of "no real scientific aptitude".

Originally employed as a bookseller for Longman & Co., Samouelle joined the Natural History Museum at the same time as William Elford Leach. Leach appears to have aided Samouelle greatly, with Bate & Westwood stating "Dr. Leach is the principal authority for Samouelle's work"; when Leach left the museum, Samouelle took over his position, but he "seemed incapable of independent work". Twenty years later, in 1840, after neglecting his work, drinking, insulting his superiors, and on one occasion, removing the labels from Adam White's specimens, Samouelle was sacked. He died less than five years later.

Samouelle was primarily interested in Lepidoptera but also wrote A nomenclature of British Entomology, or a catalogue of above 4000 species of the Classes Crustacea, Myriapoda, Spiders, Mites and insects intended as labels for cabinets of Insects, etc., alphabetically arranged. This work established new genera in other insect orders.

Samouelle was a founding member of the Entomological Club in 1826, along with Abraham Davies, Samuel Henson and Edward Newman.

References

External links
The entomologist's useful compendium; or, An introduction to the knowledge of British insects, comprising the best means of obtaining and preserving them, and a description of the apparatus generally used; together with the genera of Linné by George Samouelle, Associate of the Linnean Society of London London, Printed for T. Boys, 1819. Available at Internet Archive or Biodiversity Heritage Library.

Year of birth uncertain
1846 deaths
English lepidopterists
British carcinologists